The A.A. Hurst House is a historic residence located in Maquoketa, Iowa, United States.  This house shows the strongest influences of the Prairie School style in town.  It was built on the site of a previous house at a time when newer and larger houses were replacing Maquoketa's older buildings.  It was designed by Davenport architect E.G. Holbrook.  The two-story house features a low pitched hip roof, broad eaves, paired windows, banded windows in groups, a stuccoed exterior, and a broad porch.  Abe A. Hurst was the son of Alfred Hurst, who founded the A. Hurst and Company Lime Works and the company town of Hurstville. In addition to the family business, they were also involved
with Maquoketa Electric Light and Power Company.  This connection allowed Abe to be involved with the construction of Lakehurst, a hydro dam and power plant, in 1923. The house was listed on the National Register of Historic Places in 1991.

References

Houses completed in 1912
Prairie School architecture in Iowa
Houses in Maquoketa, Iowa
National Register of Historic Places in Jackson County, Iowa
Houses on the National Register of Historic Places in Iowa